Pachavita is a town and municipality in the Neira Province, part of the Colombian department of Boyacá. The municipality borders Chinavita in the north, Tenza and La Capilla in the south, Garagoa in the east and Úmbita in the west.

Etymology 
The name Pachavita is derived from Chibcha; pacha = man, lord and vita = point, summit, peak; "Peak of the man". Another meaning is "Proud chief".

History 
Before the arrival of the Spanish conquistadores, the area of Pachavita was part of the loose Muisca Confederation. The Muisca had different rulers and the zaque of Hunza ruled over Pachavita.

Modern Pachavita was founded on November 17, 1716.

Economy 
Main economical activity of Pachavita are agriculture and dairy farming with products yuca, maize, bananas, arracacha, beans, lulo and cucumbers, eggs, peas and cheese.

References 

Municipalities of Boyacá Department
Populated places established in 1716
1716 establishments in the Spanish Empire
Muisca Confederation
Muysccubun